In 1961 China established a state-run maritime shipping company and subsequently signed shipping agreements with many countries, laying the foundation for developing the country's ocean transport. That organization developed into the present-day China Ocean Shipping (Group) Company (COSCO). The Chinese government also invested heavily in water transport infrastructure, constructing new ports and rebuilding and enlarging older facilities.

A major effort has also been made to increase mechanization and containerization at major international ports.

China's shipping industry and container transportation have reached international standards both in handling efficiency and building networks.

The governmental responsibility of the shipping industry is under the Ministry of Transport.

The number of container units handled by Chinese ports in 2011 reached more than 150 million. The country also manufactures 90% of the world's containers.

The throughput of cargo and containers at China's ports has been the largest in the world for the past five years, with an annual growth rate of 35%.

History
The first overseas container reached China in September 1973 at Tianjin Port, which later set up the country's first container berth in 1980.

The 1990s saw rapid growth in the container transportation industry, and in 2002 China overtook the United States to become the world's top handler of containers.

In 2006, the country handled 5.6 billion tons of cargo and 93 million TEUs (20-foot container equivalent units). Twelve ports recorded cargo throughput of more than 100 million tons, with the Port of Shanghai handling 530 million tons, making it the world's busiest port.

Water transportation accounts for more than 90 percent of foreign trade cargo delivery, including 95 percent of imported crude oil and 99 percent of imported iron ore.

Containers have further connected China's middle and western regions to the global market, under a ports distribution strategy combining coastal areas and inner rivers.

Geography 
China's 8,700-mile- (14,000-km-) long coastline is indented by 100 large and small bays and has 20 deepwater harbours, most of which are ice-free throughout the year.

Coastal shipping is divided into two principal navigation zones, the northern and southern marine districts.

The northern district extends north from Xiamen to the North Korean border, with Shanghai as its administrative centre. The southern district extends south from Xiamen to the Vietnamese border, with Guangzhou as the administrative center.

Most of the ocean-going routes begin from the ports of Dalian, Qinghuangdao, Xingang, Qingdao, Shanghai, Huangpu, Zhanjiang, or Hong Kong.

Shanghai, the leading port of China from the early 19th century, was eclipsed by Hong Kong when the latter was reincorporated into the country in 1997.

Yangtze River Hu-Yu Route
On June 23, 2007, renovations on the section of the Yangtze River between Luzhou and Chongqing, also known as the Hu-Yu Sea Route, have been completed. These renovations mean that ships over a thousand tons can now arrive in Luzhou.

Before the renovations, the Hu-Yu Sea Route was unable to suitably support the shipping needs of the Sichuan economy. In October 2005, renovations started with a total investment of 120 million yuan (US$15.7 million). After two years of work, the Hu-Yu Route channel has been significantly enlarged to a depth of 2.7 meters and a width of 50 meters. The result is that vessels as large as 3000 tons can now navigate the Hu-Yu Sea Route.

Laws and regulations

Greek forays

Greek firms have managed to capture the immense expansion of South East Asia and particularly Europe. Dry bulk shipping firms dealing in iron and coal have benefited from the development.

Ports and canals
List of ports in China
Grand Canal (China)
List of busiest container ports
Lists of canals

Companies

 China COSCO Shipping
China Ocean Shipping (Group) Company (COSCO)
COSCO Shipping Holdings
COSCO Shipping Ports
COSCO Shipping International
China International Marine Containers
China Shipping Group
China Shipping Container Lines
China Shipping Development
 China Merchants
China Merchants Holdings (International)
China Merchants Energy Shipping
Sinotrans (Sinotrans Shipping)
The China Navigation Company
Orient Overseas Container Line
Nan Fung Group
Parakou Shipping

See also
Transport in China
China Classification Society
International Chamber of Shipping (ICS)
Shipping portal
Ship registration in Hong Kong
The Revolution of Ship Registration in Hong Kong
List of maritime colleges
Shanghai Maritime University
Dalian Maritime University

References

Asian Times Online Chinese shipping aims for global leadership
 China Ships The World Forbes Special Report.

External links
Chinese shipping Official website of the Ministry of Transport 
Chinese shipping industry information
Chinese shipping news information/news

Further reading
 Theroux, P., Sailing through China (Michael Russell, 1983)

Water transport in China
Industry in China
Industry